Social-pragmatic theory may refer to:
Developmental social-pragmatic model, a therapy approach to autism spectrum disorders
Social-pragmatic theory of language acquisition which has also been linked to autism studies

See also
Language acquisition device
Statistical learning theory